Bynari is a defunct company based in Dallas, developing server and email software, mainly known for its Insight Family, similar to Microsoft Exchange Server with Outlook.

Development of the products is a joint effort with various OEM partners.

Insight Family
Bynari's products support various email clients. Microsoft Outlook, Novell Evolution, and Mozilla Sunbird are used for groupware sharing with the current products.

Bynari's products consist of:
 Insight Server is an email server that supports Linux and SCO's Open Server operating systems.
 Insight Connector provides Outlook sharing for IMAP servers like Cyrus IMAP server, Courier Mail Server, Kolab and Insight Server.
 Insight Addressbook allows Outlook contacts sharing with LDAP servers.
 Insight Client is the web mail client, provides web browser access and shares calendars, contacts, folders and tasks with desktop clients.

Insight Server
Insight Server, formerly known as TradeXCH, is mostly a suite of many open source applications using components of Cyrus IMAP, Exim, Postfix, Berkeley DB, OpenLDAP,  Apache, and ProFTP. Bynari has developed a web interface for administrating the different applications.

It was the first commercial web server based on the open source software Kolab version 1. A version based on Kolab 2 was canceled, because of Kolab's change of storing the data. It also uses Spamassassin, Clamav, and AMaViS for security. It conforms to open standards: SyncML, GroupDAV, CalDAV, and WebDAV. The middleware products are developed by Bynari and provide groupware sharing with calendars, contacts, and tasks.

Insight Connector
The Insight Connector is a server that works like a Microsoft Exchange Server, but using IMAP and a Microsoft Outlook plugin. The server also supports MAPI Message Store Provider and thus being able to edit and change the groupware-Data "live and online" using any IMAP server. The server is also used by IBM serving over 4.600 companies.

References

Further reading

External links
 

Groupware
Software companies based in Texas
Defunct software companies of the United States